Borisoglebsky (masculine), Borisoglebskaya (feminine), or Borisoglebskoye (neuter) is the name of several inhabited localities in Russia.

Modern localities
Urban localities
Borisoglebsky, Yaroslavl Oblast, a work settlement in Borisoglebsky District of Yaroslavl Oblast

Rural localities
Borisoglebsky, Murmansk Oblast, an inhabited locality in Pechengsky District of Murmansk Oblast
Borisoglebskoye, Kemerovo Oblast (or Borisoglebsky), a selo in Novovostochnaya Rural Territory of Tyazhinsky District in Kemerovo Oblast; 
Borisoglebskoye, Kostroma Oblast, a selo in Zavrazhnoye Settlement of Kadyysky District in Kostroma Oblast; 
Borisoglebskoye, Oryol Oblast, a selo in Krasnoarmeysky Selsoviet of Sverdlovsky District in Oryol Oblast
Borisoglebskoye, Vologda Oblast, a village in Vysokovsky Selsoviet of Vologodsky District in Vologda Oblast

Abolished localities
Borisoglebskaya, a village in Lapshinsky Selsoviet of Vokhomsky District of Kostroma Oblast; abolished on October 6, 2004

References

Notes

Sources